Vacuum melting may refer to :

Vacuum induction melting
Vacuum arc remelting
Any melting in a Vacuum furnace

See also
Vacuum metallurgy